The Canadian province of Nova Scotia was a British colony with a system of responsible government since 1848, before it joined Canadian Confederation in 1867. Since Confederation, the province has been a part of the Canadian federation and has kept its own legislature to deal with provincial matters.

Nova Scotia has a unicameral Westminster-style parliamentary government, in which the premier is the leader of the party that controls the most seats in the House of Assembly.  The premier is Nova Scotia's head of government, and the king in right of Nova Scotia is its head of state and is represented by the lieutenant governor of Nova Scotia. The premier picks a cabinet from the elected members to form the Executive Council of Nova Scotia, and presides over that body.

Members are first elected to the House during general elections. General elections must be conducted every five years from the date of the last election, but the premier may ask for early dissolution of the Legislative Assembly. An election may also occur if the governing party loses the confidence of the legislature by the defeat of a supply bill or tabling of a confidence motion. Nova Scotia has had 27 individuals serve as premier since Confederation, of which 12 were Conservatives, 14 were Liberals, and one NDP.

Premiers of Nova Scotia

Notes

References 
General

 
 

Specific

External links
 Premier of Nova Scotia

Nova Scotia

Premiers
Premiers